Oak Dale is an unincorporated community in north central Erath County, Texas. Oak Dale is located along Texas State Highway 108 just south of the intersection of Fm-3205. A Primitive Baptist Church, Cemetery with a Community Center, Soda Shoppe and Steak House, and a Volunteer Fire Department existed at the site through the 2000s (decade).

References

External links
 Oak Dale United Methodist Church

Unincorporated communities in Texas
Unincorporated communities in Erath County, Texas